Irfan Khan  is an Indian footballer who plays as a midfielder for Pailan Arrows in the I-League.

Career

Pailan Arrows
On 19 June 2012 it was confirmed that Khan would join Pailan Arrows of the I-League from the Tata Football Academy. On 28 August 2012 he made his debut for the club against Air India FC in the 2012 Durand Cup in which Pailan drew 1–1 but were knocked out on points.

Career statistics

Club
Statistics accurate as of 15 September 2012

References

Indian footballers
1993 births
Living people
I-League players
Indian Arrows players
Footballers from Uttar Pradesh
Association football midfielders